El País  is a newspaper published in Tarija, Bolivia, the capital city of the homonimous Bolivian department. It is a part of the editorial group Boquerón Multimedia.

History 
The newspaper was founded on June 13, 1991 by Jaime Antonio "Jimmy" Borda Campero, a Bolivian professional journalist formed in Universidad de La Plata, Argentina. Fernando del Carpio was his associate, but later transferred actions to René Javier Caso Borda and Gastón Vaca Guzmán Aparicio. El País is a member of Boquerón Multimedia, a group which also owns El País Radio, Plus TLT, a TV channel broadcast through the Bolivian satellite Túpac Katari, and El Nacional and El Bermejeño newspapers, as well as elpaisonline.com news webpage. El País also edits specialized supplements such as "Cántaro", "Campeón", "Crónica", "La Billetera", "La Mano del Moto", "Pura Cepa" and "Te Invito".

Columnists 
Among its main collaborators and columnists are Carlos Hugo Molina, Adalid Contreras Baspineiro, Jordán Segovia Gareca, Guillem Martínez, Rodrigo Ayala Bluske, Frei Betto, Fernando G. Torres Gorena, Julio César Centeno, Gary Antonio Rodríguez Álvarez, Mauricio Ríos García, Arnold Hagens and Dorys Méndez. El País newspaper publishes an illustrated yearbook dedicated to the most outstanding events of the year in Bolivia.

References

Newspapers published in Bolivia
Mass media in Tarija